Wayne Township is one of the fourteen townships of Clermont County, Ohio, United States. The 2010 census reported 4,885 people living in the township, 4,493 of whom were in the unincorporated portions of the township.

Geography
Located in the northeast corner of the county, it borders the following townships:
Harlan Township, Warren County - north
Marion Township, Clinton County - northeast
Perry Township, Brown County - east
Jackson Township - south
Stonelick Township - southwest
Goshen Township - west

The village of Newtonsville is located in southwestern Wayne Township.

Name and history
It is one of 20 Wayne Townships statewide.

Government
The township is governed by a three-member board of trustees, who are elected in November of odd-numbered years to a four-year term beginning on the following January 1. Two are elected in the year after the presidential election and one is elected in the year before it. There is also an elected township fiscal officer, who serves a four-year term beginning on April 1 of the year after the election, which is held in November of the year before the presidential election. Vacancies in the fiscal officership or on the board of trustees are filled by the remaining trustees.

References

External links
Township website
County website

Townships in Clermont County, Ohio